Hemilophia is a genus of flowering plants belonging to the family Brassicaceae.

Its native range is Southern Central China.

Species:

Hemilophia franchetii 
Hemilophia pulchella 
Hemilophia rockii 
Hemilophia serpens 
Hemilophia sessilifolia

References

Brassicaceae
Brassicaceae genera